Shane MacDonald (born May 26, 1993 in Elora, Ontario, Canada) is a Canadian lacrosse player for the Minnesota Swarm in the National Lacrosse League.

Junior career
Before entering the 2014 National Lacrosse League Entry Draft Shane MacDonald was a forward for the Brampton Excelsiors in Major Series Lacrosse, the Orangeville Northmen Jr. A of the OLA Junior A Lacrosse League and the Elora Mohawks of the OLA Junior B Lacrosse League.

Professional career
Shane MacDonald was selected fifth overall in the 2014 National Lacrosse League Entry Draft by the Minnesota Swarm who had received the pick in a trade with the Buffalo Bandits. In his rookie season in the National Lacrosse League MacDonald had a rather low scoring season with only 6 goals, 7 assist and 13 points.

NLL Statistics

References

External links
 Retrieved 2015-05-31 Wlalacrosse.com
 Retrieved 2015-05-31 Mnswarm.com

1993 births
Living people
Canadian lacrosse players
Lacrosse people from Ontario
Minnesota Swarm players
People from Centre Wellington